Fanny Buitrago is a Colombian fiction writer and playwright best known for her novel Señora de la miel. She was born in Barranquilla, Colombia in 1943.

Publications
Her best-known book is Señora de la miel (Senora Honeycomb or Mrs Honeycomb; translated into English in 1996).  Her first novel was El hostigante verano de los dioses (The Tormenting Summer of the Gods; 1963).

Themes
She generally avoids overt political messages, although she has dealt with the civil unrest of la Violencia, preferring to focus on broken homes and families which act as metaphors for a country suffering great upheaval. Her works have been associated with the Nadaísmo movement in Colombia.

Awards
In 1964 she won the Cali Theater Festival Prize for her play El hombre de paja (Scarecrow).

References

1943 births
Living people
People from Barranquilla
Colombian women writers
International Writing Program alumni